Citrazinic acid (CZA) is a heterocyclic compound consisting of a dihydropyridine ring derived with a carboxylate group. The yellow solid exists as multiple tautomers, and it frequently forms dimers. 

Citrazinic acid is commonly formed in citric acid based carbon nanodots (CND). It is responsible for the blue light found in citric acid CNDs. The wavelengths of light emitted by citrazinic in CNDs can be shifted by changing the pH of the solution.

Preparation 
Citrazinic acid can be prepared creating a solution of citric acid and toluenesulfonic acid, which forms a 1,3-diester. That solution, when added to a heated ammonia solution results in citrazinic acid.

References 

Carboxylic acids
2-Pyridones